Alfred Jonas Dowuona-Hammond was a Ghanaian politician and a state minister in the first republic. He served as Minister of Education and Social Welfare and Minister of Communications in the Nkrumah government.

Early life and education
Alfred was born on 17 June 1920 at Pampanso; a village in the Eastern Region to Hansen Dowuona-Hammond and Madam Beatrice Nettey.

He had his early education at Sempe Government Junior Boys' School and Rowe Road Government Senior Boys' School in Accra. He had his secondary education at Mfantsipim School, the Accra Academy and O 'Reilly Educational Institute where he obtained his Cambridge School Certificate with exemption from the London Matriculation Examination in 1940.

Career
After completing his secondary school education in 1940, Alfred joined the staff of the O 'Reilly Educational Institute rising to the position of assistant head master in his two-year tenure as a staff of the school. In 1942 he was employed by the United Africa Company (UAC) as probationer manager. He served in the company for five years working in Koforidua, Accra and Sekondi. He joined the staff of CPP's national schools in 1947. He founded the Winneba Secondary School in 1949 and in 1950 he served the government as an inspector of cooperatives.

Politics
In 1950 CPP leaders were arrested and the CPP national schools were consequently closed down, however in 1951 he was called to the movement's headquarters in Winneba when the CPP won the general election that year. In 1954 he was elected member of the legislative assembly representing the Awutu constituency; where his mother's hometown is situated. He won the seat in the subsequent elections that took place in the first republic. In 1956 he was appointed parliamentary secretary to the ministry of Labour and Co-operatives. He was promoted as Minister of Education when Ghana became a republic in July 1960. He served in this capacity for four years. In 1964 he was appointed Minister of Communications. He remained in this position until February 1966 when the Nkrumah government was overthrown by the NLC.

Personal life
His hobbies included gardening, football, athletics and music.

See also
Nkrumah government
Minister for Education (Ghana)
Minister for Communications (Ghana)

References

1920 births
Possibly living people
Alumni of the Accra Academy
Mfantsipim School alumni
Ghanaian MPs 1954–1956
Ghanaian MPs 1956–1965